Dame×Prince, also known as , is a Japanese otome visual novel created by NHN PlayArt. It was released in Japan on March 31, 2016, for Android and iOS devices. An anime television series adaptation by Studio Flad, titled Dame×Prince Anime Caravan, aired from January 10 to March 28, 2018.

Characters

Other media
An anime television series adaptation by Studio Flad, titled Dame×Prince Anime Caravan, aired from January 10, 2018, to March 28, 2018. The opening theme is "D×D×D" by Breakerz. The anime is licensed by Sentai Filmworks and streamed on Hidive.

Notes

References

External links
 
 

2016 video games
Android (operating system) games
Anime television series based on video games
IOS games
Otome games
Male harem anime and manga
Sentai Filmworks
Studio Flad
Visual novels